Golonka, flaki i inne przysmaki (Polish: Knuckle, tripe and other delicacies) is a studio album by punk rock band Big Cyc, released in 1995.

Track listing
"Śmierdzące podwórka" (Smelly backyards)
"Dramat fryzjerski" (Hairdresser's drama)
"Strzeż się tych palantów" (Beware of those jerks)
"Marysia (Ćwierkają wróbelki)" (Marysia (The sparrows are chirping))
"Ona chciała tylko autograf" (She just wanted an autograph)
"Nie mów o miłości" (Don't talk about love)
"Życie duchowe zupy ogórkowej" (The spiritual life of the cucumber soup)
"Czynny całą dobę" (Open 24 hours a day)
"Wibrator" (Vibrator)
"Urzędnicy" (Clerks)
"Prom do Sztokholmu" (Ferry to Stockholm)
"Pieśń parlamentarna" (The parliamentary song)
"Goryle" (Bouncers)
"Kraciaste koszule" (The flannel shirts)
"Przemówienie Lecha Wałęsy na zjeździe Hodowców Trzody Chlewnej" (Lech Wałęsa's speech at the convention of Pig Breeders)
"Świetny interes" (The great business)

Personnel
Dżej Dżej – bass guitar, lead vocal
Dżery – drums, vocal
Piękny Roman – lead guitar, vocal
Skiba – vocal, lyrics

1995 albums
Big Cyc albums